Clark M. Perry (July 27, 1872 – January 30, 1936) was an American businessman and politician.

Born in Oshkosh, Wisconsin, Perry went to Oshkosh High School. He then worked as a decorating contractor. In 1921, Perry served in the Wisconsin State Assembly and was a Republican. From 1924 t0 1926, Perry served as Wisconsin Prohibition Chief.

In 1926, Perry pleaded guilty to a charge of liquor conspiracy while serving as Prohibition Chief. He was sentenced to 3 years in prison but was released after serving one year. Perry died at his home in Milwaukee, Wisconsin after a long illness.

Notes

1872 births
1936 deaths
Politicians from Oshkosh, Wisconsin
Businesspeople from Wisconsin
Wisconsin politicians convicted of crimes
Republican Party members of the Wisconsin State Assembly